The 54th Karlovy Vary International Film Festival took place from June 28 to July 6, 2019, in Karlovy Vary, Czech Republic.

A total of 177 films were presented at the festival, including 34 world premieres, eight international and six European premieres. Bulgarian-Greek co-produced film, The Father won the Crystal Globe.

Juries
The following were appointed as the juries at the 54th edition:

Grand Jury
Štěpán Hulík (Czech Republic)
Annemarie Jacir (Palestine)
Sergei Loznitsa (Ukraine)
Angeliki Papoulia (Greece)
Charles Tesson (France)

FIPRESCI Jury
Hugo Emmerzael (Netherlands)
Viktor Palák (Czech Republic)
Ana Sturm (Slovenia)

Europa Cinemas Label Jury
Maarten Alexandra (Belgium)
Carinzia Camilleri (Malta)
Éva Demeter (Hungary)
Denis Samardžić (Bosnia and Herzegovina)

East of the West
Denis Ivanov (Ukraine)
Juho Kuosmanen (Finland)
Tomáš Pavlíček (Czech Republic)
Ioanna Stais (Greece)
Dagnė Vildžiūnaite (Lithuania)

The Ecumenical Jury
Alyda Faber (Canada)
Martin Horálek (Czech Republic)
Peter Sheehan (Australia)

Documentary Films
Andreas Horvath (Austria)
Aline Schmid (Switzerland)
Gastón Solnicki (Argentina)

FEDEORA Jury
Maja Bogojević (Montenegro)
Pavlina Jeleva (Bulgaria)
Chiara Spagnoli Gabardi (Italy)

Official selection

In competition

Highlighted title and dagger indicates Crystal Globe winner.
Highlighted title and double-dagger indicates Special Jury Prize winner.

Out of competition

East of the West

Highlighted title and dagger indicates East of the West winner.
Highlighted title and double-dagger indicates East of the West Special Jury Prize winner.

Documentary Films

Highlighted title and dagger indicates Best Documentary Film winner.
Highlighted title and double-dagger indicates Documentary Special Jury Prize winner.

Another View

Czech Films 2018–2019

Future Frames: Generation NEXT of European Cinema

Horizons

Imagina

Liberated

Midnight Screenings

Out of the Past

People Next Door

Prague Short Film Festival Presents

Special Events

Tribute to Youssef Chahine
This segment was presented as a tribute to Egyptian filmmaker Youssef Chahine.

Awards
The following awards were presented at the 54th edition:

Official selection awards
Grand Prix – Crystal Globe
The Father by Kristina Grozeva and Petar Valchanov

Special Jury Prize
Lara by Jan-Ole Gerster

Best Director
Tim Mielants for Patrick

Best Actress
Corinna Harfouch for Lara

Best Actor
Milan Ondrík for Let There Be Light

Special Jury Mention
The August Virgin by Jonás Trueba
Antonia Giesen for The Man of the Future

Other statutory awards
East of the West Grand Prix
The Bull by Boris Akopov

East of the West Special Jury Prize
My Thoughts Are Silent by Antonio Lukich

Grand Prix for Best Documentary Film
Immortal by Ksenia Okhapkina

Documentary Special Jury Prize
Confucian Dream by Mijie Li

Právo Audience Award
Jiří Suchý: Tackling Life with Ease by Olga Sommerová

Crystal Globe for Outstanding Artistic Contribution to World Cinema
Julianne Moore (United States)
Patricia Clarkson (United States)

Festival President's Award for Contribution to Czech Cinematography
Vladimír Smutný (Czech Republic)

Non-statutory awards
Award of International Film Critics (FIPRESCI)
The August Virgin by Jonás Trueba

The Ecumenical Jury Award
Lara by Jan-Ole Gerster

Ecumenical Jury Commendation
Let There Be Light by Marko Škop

FEDEORA Award
Passed by Censor by Serhat Karaaslan

FEDEORA Jury Special Mention
Aga's House by Lendita Zeqiraj

Europa Cinemas Label Award
Scandinavian Silence by Martti Helde

References

Karlovy Vary International Film Festival
Karlovy Vary International Film Festival
Karlovy Vary International Film Festival